Akkalwadi  is a village in Parner taluka in Ahmednagar district of state of Maharashtra, India.

Religion
The majority of the population in the village is Hindu.

Economy
The primary occupation of majority pf the population is agriculture.
Crop: Potato, Jwari.
Temple: Goddess Akkabai

See also
 Parner taluka
 Villages in Parner taluka

References 

Villages in Parner taluka